Live at Wacken Open Air 2006 (undertitled A Night to Remember - A Journey Through Time) is a live DVD released by the German heavy metal band Scorpions. It was supposed to be released on 18 December 2007 but was delayed till 12 February 2008 for reasons undisclosed to the public.

The set list was decided through a vote on the Scorpions official website, as explained by the band:

Track listing
"Coming Home"
"Bad Boys Running Wild"
"The Zoo"
"Loving You Sunday Morning"
"Make It Real"
"Pictured Life"
"Speedy's Coming"
"We'll Burn the Sky"
"Love 'Em or Leave 'Em"
"Don't Believe Her"
"Tease Me Please Me"
"Coast to Coast"
"Holiday"
"Lovedrive"
"Another Piece of Meat"
"Kottak Attack"
"Blackout"
"No One Like You"
"Six String Sting"
"Big City Nights"
"Can't Get Enough"
"Still Loving You"
"In Trance"
"Bolero"
"Ready to Sting" (Appearance of the Scorpion)
"Rock You Like a Hurricane"

Omitted Songs
 "Dark Lady"
 "He's a Woman - She's a Man"
 "In Search of the Peace of Mind"
 "Dynamite"

Personnel
Band members
Klaus Meine – lead vocals
Rudolf Schenker – guitars, backing vocals
Matthias Jabs – guitars, backing vocals
Paweł Mąciwoda – bass, backing vocals
James Kottak – drums, backing vocals

Special guests
Uli Jon Roth – guitar on tracks 6, 7, 8, 23, 24 + "He's a Woman – She's a Man", "Dark Lady"
Michael Schenker – guitar on tracks 12, 13, 14, 15, 23, 24 + "In Search of the Peace of Mind"
Herman Rarebell – drums on tracks 17, 18, 24 + "Dynamite", "In Search of the Peace of Mind"
Tyson Schenker (Michael Schenker's son) – guitar on track 24

References

Scorpions (band) video albums
2007 video albums
Live video albums